Franz  Xaver Winterhalter (20 April 1805 – 8 July 1873) was a German painter and lithographer, known for his flattering portraits of royalty and upper-class society in the mid-19th century. His name has become associated with fashionable court portraiture. Among his best known works are Empress Eugénie Surrounded by her Ladies in Waiting (1855) and the portraits he made of Empress Elisabeth of Austria (1865).

Early years
Franz Xaver Winterhalter was born in the small village of Menzenschwand (now part of Sankt Blasien), in Germany's Black Forest in the Electorate of Baden, on 20 April 1805. He was the sixth child of Fidel Winterhalter (1773–1863), a farmer and resin producer in the village, and his wife Eva Meyer (1765–1838), a member of a long established Menzenschwand family. His father was of peasant stock and was a powerful influence in his life. Of the eight brothers and sisters, only four survived infancy. Throughout his life Franz Xaver remained very close to his family, in particular to his brother Hermann (1808–1891), who was also a painter.

After attending school at a Benedictine monastery in St. Blasien, Winterhalter left Menzenschwand in 1818 at the age of 13 to study drawing and engraving. He trained as a draughtsman and lithographer in the workshop of Karl Ludwig Schüler (1785–1852) in Freiburg im Breisgau. In 1823, at the age of 18, he went to Munich, sponsored by the industrialist Baron von Eichtal (1775–1850). In 1825, he was granted a stipend by Ludwig I, Grand Duke of Baden (1763–1830) and began a course of study at the Academy of Arts in Munich with Peter von Cornelius (1783–1867), whose academic methods made him uncomfortable. Winterhalter found a more congenial mentor in the fashionable portraitist Joseph Karl Stieler (1781–1858). During this time, he supported himself working as lithographer.

Winterhalter entered court circles when in 1828 he became drawing master to Sophie Margravine of Baden, at Karlsruhe. His opportunity to establish himself beyond southern Germany came in 1832 when he was able to travel to Italy, 1833–1834, with the support of Grand Duke Leopold of Baden. In Rome he composed romantic genre scenes in the manner of Louis Léopold Robert and attached himself to the circle of the director of the French Academy, Horace Vernet. On his return to Karlsruhe he painted portraits of the Grand Duke Leopold of Baden and his wife, and was appointed painter to the grand-ducal court.

Nevertheless, he left Baden to move to France, where his Italian genre scene Il dolce Farniente attracted notice at the Salon of 1836. Il Decameron a year later was also praised; both paintings are academic compositions in the style of Raphael. In the Salon of 1838 he exhibited a portrait of the Prince of Wagram with his young daughter. His career as a portrait painter was soon secured when in the same year he painted Louise Marie of Orleans, Queen of the Belgians, and her son. It was probably through this painting that Winterhalter came to the notice of Maria Amalia of the Two Sicilies, Queen of the French, mother of the Queen of the Belgians.

Court painter

In Paris, Winterhalter quickly became fashionable. He was appointed court painter of Louis-Philippe, the king of the French, who commissioned him to paint individual portraits of his large family. Winterhalter would execute more than thirty commissions for him.

This success earned the painter the reputation of a specialist in dynastic and aristocratic portraiture, skilled in combining likeness with flattery and enlivening official pomp with modern fashion.

However, Winterhalter's reputation in artistic circles suffered. The critics, who had praised his debut in the salon of 1836, dismissed him as a painter who could not be taken seriously. This attitude persisted throughout Winterhalter's career, condemning his work to a category of his own in the hierarchy of painting. Winterhalter himself regarded his first royal commissions as a temporary intermission before returning to subject painting and the field of academic respectability, but he was a victim of his own success, and for the rest of his life he worked almost exclusively as a portrait painter. His success in this field made him rich. Winterhalter became an international celebrity enjoying Royal patronage.

Among his many regal sitters was also Queen Victoria. Winterhalter first visited England in 1842, and returned several times to paint Victoria, Prince Albert and their growing family, painting at least 120 works for them, a large number of which remain in the Royal Collection, on display to the public at Buckingham Palace and other royal residences. On display at Osborne House is Florinda, given by Victoria as a birthday present for Albert in 1852. Winterhalter also painted a few portraits of the aristocracy in England, mostly members of court circles. The fall of Louis-Philippe in 1848 did not affect the painter's reputation. Winterhalter went to Switzerland and worked in Belgium and England.

Persistence saw Winterhalter survive from the fall of one dynasty to the rise of another. Paris remained his home until a couple of years before his death. In the same year, his marriage proposal was rejected, and Winterhalter remained a bachelor committed to his work.

After the accession of Napoleon III, his popularity grew. From then on, under the Second Empire, Winterhalter became the chief portraitist of the imperial family and court of France. The beautiful French Empress Eugénie became a favorite sitter, and she treated him generously. In 1855 Winterhalter painted his masterpiece: The Empress Eugénie Surrounded by her Ladies in Waiting. He set the French Empress in a pastoral setting gathering flowers in a harmonious circle with her ladies in waiting. The painting was acclaimed and exhibited in the universal exposition in 1855. It remains Winterhalter's most famous work. The composition shows a marked similarity to Florinda and this gave rise to scandalous gossip that the Empress and her ladies had posed déshabillé for the earlier painting.

In 1852, he went to Spain to paint Queen Isabella II with her daughter. Russian aristocratic visitors to Paris also liked to have their portraits executed by the famous master. As the "Painter of Princes", Winterhalter was thereafter in constant demand by the courts of Britain (from 1841), Spain, Belgium, Russia, Mexico, the German states, and France. During the 1850s and 1860s, Winterhalter painted a number of important portraits of Polish and Russian aristocrats. In 1857, he painted the portrait of Tsarina Maria Alexandrovna.

During the Second Mexican Empire in the 1860s, headed by Maximilian I of Mexico, Winterhalter was commissioned to paint portraits of the Imperial couple. The Empress consort of Mexico, Charlotte of Belgium was the daughter of Louise-Marie of France, Queen of the Belgians, whom Winterhalter painted at the beginning of his career in France. Some of Winterhalter's paintings of the Mexican monarchs still remain in their Mexico City palace, Chapultepec Castle, now the National Museum of History.

Last years
[[Image:Franz Xaver Winterhalter Portrait of Madame Barbe de Rimsky-Korsakov.jpg|thumb|left| Barbe Dmitrievna Mergassov Madame Rimsky-Korsakov (1864), oil on canvas, 117 × 90 cm, Musée d'Orsay, Paris.]]

To deal with those pressing for portrait commissions, many of whom were calling for multiple replicas, Winterhalter made extensive use of assistants. No portrait painter had ever enjoyed such an extraordinary royal patronage as Winterhalter; only Rubens and Van Dyck worked as he did in an international network.

Winterhalter sought respite from the pressures of his work with holidays abroad in Italy, Switzerland, and above all Germany. Despite the many years, he lived in France, he remained deeply attached to his native country. For all his success and popularity, Winterhalter continued to live simply and abstemiously. In 1859 he bought a villa in Baden-Baden, his favorite vacation spot.

In 1864 Winterhalter made his last visit to England. In the autumn of that year he traveled to Vienna to execute the portraits of Emperor Franz Joseph and Empress Elisabeth that remain among his most well-known works. As he grew older, Winterhalter's links with France weakened while his interest in Germany grew. He was taking a cure in Switzerland at the outbreak of the Franco-Prussian War, the war that ended the Second French Empire. After the war, the painter did not return to France, going instead to Baden. He was officially still accredited at the court of Baden and he settled in Karlsruhe. In the last two years of his life Winterhalter painted very little. During a visit to Frankfurt am Main in the summer of 1873 he contracted typhus and died on 8 July. He was 68 years old.

Style

Winterhalter came into his own as a portrait painter during the second Empire and he painted his best work during the last two decades of his life. He matched his style to the luxury and relaxed atmosphere of the age, its hedonism and gaiety. His female sitters of the 1850s and 1860s inhabit a different physiological climate from those he painted earlier; they are not reticent and reserved. His male sitters inspired few original or memorable compositions.

Winterhalter never received high praise for his work from serious critics, being constantly accused of superficiality and affectation in pursuit of popularity. However, he was highly appreciated by his aristocratic patrons. The royal families of England, France, Spain, Russia, Portugal, Mexico, and Belgium all commissioned him to paint portraits. His monumental canvases established a substantial popular reputation, and lithographic copies of the portraits helped to spread his fame.

Winterhalter's portraits were prized for their subtle intimacy; the nature of his appeal is not difficult to explain. He created the image his sitters wished or needed to project to their subjects. He was not only skilled at posing his sitters to create almost theatrical compositions, but also was a virtuoso in the art of conveying the texture of fabrics, furs and jewellery, to which he paid no less attention than to the face. He painted very rapidly and very fluently, designing most of his compositions directly in the canvas. His portraits are elegant, refined, lifelike, and pleasantly idealized.

Concerning Winterhalter's method of working, it is thought that, practiced as he was at drawing and representing figures, he painted directly onto the canvas without making preliminary studies. He frequently decided upon the dress and pose of the sitter. His style was suave, cosmopolitan and plausible. Many of the portraits were copied in his workshop or reproduced as lithographs.

As an artist he remained a difficult figure to place; there are few painters with whom to compare him, and he does not fit into any school. His early affinities were Neoclassical but his style can be described as Neo-Rococo. After his death, his painting fell out of favor, being considered romantic, glossy, and superficial. Little was known about him personally and his art was not taken seriously until recently. However, a major exhibition of his work at the National Portrait Gallery (United Kingdom) in London and the Petit Palais in Paris in 1987 brought him into the limelight again. His paintings are exhibited today in leading European and American museums.

All artworks

Notes

References
Ormond, Richard, and Blackett-Ord, Carol, Franz Xaver Winterhalter and the Courts of Europe, 1830–70, Exh. cat. National Portrait Gallery, London, 1987. .
Reisberg von, Eugene Barilo. Franz Xaver Winterhalter (1805–1873) Catalogue Raisonne, BvR Arts Management, 2007, .
Kessler Aurisch, Helga et alii: High society: the portraits of Franz Xaver Winterhalter. Stuttgart: Arnoldsche Art Publishers; Houston: In association with The Museum of Fine Arts, Augustinermuseum, Städtische Museen Freiburg, Palais de Compiegne, 2015. 
Burlion Emmanuel, Franz Xaver et Hermann Winterhalter , Brest, 2016, 175 pages.
 Barilo von Reisberg, Eugene Arnold : Franz Xaver Winterhalter (1805–1873): portraiture in the age of social change'',  School of Culture and Communication, 2016,

External links

 
Winterhalter in Menzenschwand
franzxaverwinterhalter.wordpress
J. Paul Getty Trust
Olga's Gallery – Online Art Museum
Artcyclopedia

1805 births
1873 deaths
People from Sankt Blasien
People from the Electorate of Baden
German romantic painters
Academic art
Court painters
19th-century German painters
19th-century German male artists
German male painters
Burials at Frankfurt Main Cemetery
Romantic painters